Grigori Dronov (born 10 January 1998) is a Russian professional ice hockey defenceman currently playing with Metallurg Magnitogorsk of the Kontinental Hockey League (KHL).

Playing career
Dronov originally played as a youth within Metallurg Magnitogorsk junior program before making his professional debut with 
Metallurg Magnitogorsk in the Kontinental Hockey League (KHL) during the 2016–17 season.

In his sixth season in the KHL with Magnitogorsk, after limited to just 6 regular season games, Dronov broke out in the playoffs, placing second in league scoring amongst defenseman with 14 points to help Metallurg advance to the Gagarin Cup finals.

As a free agent, Dronov opted to pursue his NHL ambitions. After originally reported to accept an invitation to the Arizona Coyotes training camp, Dronov later agreed to a tryout with the Carolina Hurricanes, appearing in prospects showcase before participating at the Hurricanes training camp. Following positive reviews through training camp and pre-season, Dronov was signed to a one-year, two-way contract with the Hurricanes and was immediately assigned to join AHL affiliate, the Chicago Wolves, on 4 October 2022. However, before his contract was officially lodged with the NHL, the Hurricanes announced they had mutually agreed to part ways on 6 October 2022. 

Dronov returned to Russia, and resumed his tenure with Metallurg Magnitogorsk, signing a one-year contract for the remainder of the 2022–23 season on 15 October 2022.

Career statistics

Regular season and playoffs

International

References

External links
 

1998 births
Living people
Metallurg Magnitogorsk players
People from Magnitogorsk
Russian ice hockey defencemen
Sportspeople from Chelyabinsk Oblast